Newton Falls may refer to:

 Newton Falls, Ohio
 Newton Falls, New York
Newton Lower Falls, Massachusetts
Newton Upper Falls, Massachusetts